Orhan Ademi (born 28 October 1991) is a Swiss professional footballer who plays as forward for 3. Liga club VfB Oldenburg.

Early life and career
Ademi is of Macedonian Albanian descent. His parents emigrated to St. Gallen, Switzerland from Kumanovo. Adami began his footballing career as a teenager at Au-Berneck and eventually moved to SCR Altach in Austria.

Club career
Ademi started his senior career in Austria, playing for SC Rheindorf Altach from 2008 until 2012. For the 2012–13 season he transferred to German 2. Bundesliga side Eintracht Braunschweig. During his first season with his new club, Braunschweig and Ademi won promotion to the Bundesliga. Ademi scored his first goal in the Bundesliga against Schalke 04 on 19 October 2013.

In January 2015, Ademi joined VfR Aalen on a six-month loan deal. On 31 August 2016, Ademi transferred to Austrian club SV Ried.

In September 2020, he moved to MSV Duisburg. He left Duisburg in the summer of 2022. On 11 July 2022, he joined UTA Arad.

On 1 February 2023, Ademi joined 3. Liga club VfB Oldenburg.

International career
On 2 October 2012, Ademi received his first call up to the Switzerland national under-21 football team for the two UEFA European Under-21 Football Championship 2013 qualification play-off games against Germany, although he did not see the field in either play-off game.

Career statistics

Honours
Würzburger Kickers
 Bavarian Cup: 2018–19

References

External links

Living people
1991 births
People from Altstätten
Swiss people of Macedonian descent
Swiss people of Albanian descent
Sportspeople from the canton of St. Gallen
Swiss men's footballers
Association football forwards
Austrian Football Bundesliga players
2. Liga (Austria) players
Bundesliga players
2. Bundesliga players
3. Liga players
Regionalliga players
Liga I players
SC Rheindorf Altach players
Eintracht Braunschweig players
Eintracht Braunschweig II players
VfR Aalen players
SV Ried players
Würzburger Kickers players
MSV Duisburg players
FC UTA Arad players
VfB Oldenburg players
Swiss expatriate footballers
Swiss expatriate sportspeople in Austria
Expatriate footballers in Austria
Swiss expatriate sportspeople in Germany
Expatriate footballers in Germany
Swiss expatriate sportspeople in Romania
Expatriate footballers in Romania